Human Rights in World Context (German: Menschenrechte im Weltkontext) is a German language book containing cultural comparison study on Human Rights around the world. Its content includes places of origin of human rights, human Rights in smaller and larger religious communities and areas for action. The book was published in 2013 by Dr. Hamid Reza Yousefi 's, an associate Professor of History of Philosophy and Intercultural Philosophy at the University of Koblenz and Landau. The targets group includes Sociologists, Cultural scientists, Politically and philosophically interested persons. Following are chapters from the book:
 Introduction by the editor - Hamid Reza Yousefi
 Places of origin of human rights
  Human Rights in African traditions - Daniela Hrzán
  Human Rights in Asian traditions - Jing-Jong Luh
  Human Rights in Eastern traditions -  Rabea Müller, Hamid Reza Yousefi 
  Human rights in European traditions - Marie-Luisa Frick
  Human Rights in Latin American traditions - Josef Estermann
 Human Rights in larger religious communities - 
  Human Rights in Zarathustratum - Marie-Luisa Frick
  Human Rights in Hinduism - Martin Mittwede
  Human Rights in Buddhism - Eiko Hanaoka
  Human Rights in Judaism - Sabine Sander
  Human Rights in Christianity - Mathias Victorien Ntep
  Human Rights in Islam - Yavuz Özoguz
  Human Rights in smaller religious communities - 
  Human Rights in the Sikh religion -  Dharam Singh Nihang Singh, Khushwant Singh 
  Human rights in Shinto - There Yoshida
  Human Rights in Freemasonry - Klaus-Jürgen Green
  Human Rights in the Baháʼí Faith - Farah Dustdar
  Human rights of the Ahmadiyya Muslim Jamaat - Maryam Khola Hübsch
  Human Rights in Yezidism - January Ilhan Kizilhan
 Human rights and their areas of action - 
  Human rights and individual - Josef Bordat
  Human Rights and Constitutional Law - Hamid Reza Yousefi

References

External links
 Read book on Google Books

2013 non-fiction books
Books about human rights
Books about Sikhism
Springer Science+Business Media books